Thomas G. Labrecque served as a former President, CEO, and COO of Chase Manhattan Bank.

Life

Labrecque, the third child of eight, was born to Theodore J. Labrecque, a New Jersey Superior Court Judge of French Canadian descent and Marjorie Labrecque. He attended Villanova University and graduated in 1960 and later went to the pursue his graduate studies  at the Kogod School of Business of American University and the New York University Stern School of Business.  Before beginning his banking career he decided to go join The United States Navy and serve four years, rising to the rank of lieutenant. During his service, Labrecque spent time serving on a destroyer at Guantanamo Bay in 1960, in the Mediterranean and Baltic Sea during the building of the Berlin Wall, and also during the Cuban Missile Crisis where he headed a section of the Office of Naval Intelligence, marshaling ships in the blockade off Cuba.

Career

In 1964, Labrecque entered the management training program at Chase Manhattan Bank and quickly made his way up.  By 1976 he was appointed to Chase's management committee when he was only 38, making him ten years younger than any other member.  During this stage point in the committee at the request of David Rockefeller (the Chief Executive during this period), Labrecque served to resolve the financial crisis at the time.

In 1981, Labrecque finally made it to president and COO of Chase Manhattan Bank.

When 1990 came, Chase bank was suffering from defaults on loans given to real estate developers and less-developed countries.  To settle the problem, the company's board looked upon Labrecque to solve the issue and named him CEO and Chairman of the firm.  In turning around the bank he divested the company's underperforming businesses and boosted profits in core divisions such as credit cards, trust and custody, and mortgage banking.  And in 1996 he orchestrated Chase Manhattan Bank's $11 billion merger deal with Chemical Bank. As part of the merger agreement, Labrecque agreed to relinquish his position to Chemical's Chairman and CEO, Walter V. Shipley and return to president and COO of the company.

During the rest of Labrecque's time, he was the key person from the bank who coped with Russia's loan default and he was also pivotal in negotiations to restructure the hedge fund, Long-Term Capital Management. In June 1999  he had stepped down to retirement.  Afterward, he served as the Chairman of Chase's International Advisory Council, a Director of Pfizer and Delphi Automotive Systems, and on the Board of Trustees of the University of Notre Dame.

In September 2000, Labrecque was diagnosed with lung cancer, though he did not smoke and was in good health prior. Only a month later in October, he died at Memorial Sloan Kettering Cancer Center. He was survived by his wife, Sheila; four children, Thomas Jr., Douglas, Karen Shea, and Barbara Corbin; five grandchildren; three brothers; and four sisters.

Other works

The J.P.Morgan Thomas G. Labrecque Smart Start Program,  which annually offers 10 New York City students a full-tuition scholarship, four years of rotational internships, a mentoring network and professional at any of 11 NYC universities, was originally created by Labrecque in 1992. The Thomas G. Labrecque Foundation was founded by the Labrecque family in 2003 in memory of their lost beloved.  As part of the foundation, the Thomas G. Labrecque Classic "Run as One" event was launched by family members and friends to raise awareness and donations to fund research for finding a cure for lung cancer, raising up to $3.5 million to date.

References

1938 births
2000 deaths
Kogod School of Business alumni
Villanova University alumni
New York University Stern School of Business alumni
JPMorgan Chase people
Deaths from lung cancer
American chief executives of financial services companies
American chief operating officers
20th-century American businesspeople
People from Long Branch, New Jersey